The genealogical method is a well-established procedure in ethnography. The method owes its origin from the book of British ethnographer W. H. R. Rivers titled "Kinship and Social Organisation" in 1911, in order to identify all-important links of kinship determined by marriage and descent.  Genealogy or kinship commonly plays a crucial role in the structure of non-industrial societies, determining both social relations and group relationship to the past.  Marriage, for example, is frequently pivotal in determining military alliances between villages, clans or ethnic groups.

In the field of epistemology the term is used to characterize the philosophical method employed by such writers as Friedrich Nietzsche and Michel Foucault.

References
 Windows on Humanity by Conrad Phillip Kottak. Chapter 2, page 38.

Ethnography